Bishalama is a Syrian village in the Qardaha District in Latakia Governorate. According to the Syria Central Bureau of Statistics (CBS), Bishalama had a population of 1,019 in the 2004 census.

References

Alawite communities in Syria
Populated places in Qardaha District